Goo Jae-yee (born Goo Eun-ae; 28 February 1986) is a South Korean actress and model. She is known for her roles in the Korean drama series The Gentlemen of Wolgyesu Tailor Shop and Mistress.

Background
Goo attended Seoul Arts High School and graduated from Ewha Womans University with the Bachelor of Dance.

Goo first worked as a model before going to an acting career in 2012.

Personal life
During her time as a model, Goo was once in relationship with Ha Jung-woo from August 2008, which later announced in April 2009. Goo and Ha had since broke up in January 2012.

On 15 June 2017, while on the way from Grand Hyatt Seoul, Goo was caught for driving under influence of alcohol near the Hannam Bridge in Seoul at 11:40 p.m, with her blood alcohol concentration of 0.051%, enough to result in the cancellation of her driver's license.

On 28 November 2018, Goo's agency My Company released an official announcement and statement of her upcoming marriage to a professor who was five years older than her and taught at a university in France, scheduled for 30 December 2018.

On 30 December 2018, Goo was married at a private ceremony in Seoul.

Filmography

Films

Short films

Television dramas

Music videos

Variety shows

External links

References

1986 births
Living people
South Korean actresses
South Korean television actresses
South Korean web series actresses
Seoul Arts High School alumni
Ewha Womans University alumni